Mihai Drăguş (born 13 March 1973 in Bucharest) is a retired Romanian football player. His son, Denis is also a footballer.

Honours
Suwon Samsung Bluewings
 K League: 1998

References

External links

 
 

1973 births
Footballers from Bucharest
Living people
Romanian footballers
FC Gloria Buzău players
FC Dinamo București players
FC Argeș Pitești players
Romanian expatriate footballers
Expatriate footballers in South Korea
Suwon Samsung Bluewings players
K League 1 players
Expatriate footballers in Russia
FC Torpedo Moscow players
FC Torpedo-2 players
FC Lokomotiv Nizhny Novgorod players
Russian Premier League players
Association football forwards